Wim Neeleman is a Dutch curler and curling coach.

Teams

Men's

Mixed

Record as a coach of national teams

References

External links

De Havenloods Hillegersberg/ Schiebroek - 12 december 2018

Living people
Dutch male curlers
Dutch curling coaches
Year of birth missing (living people)
Place of birth missing (living people)
21st-century Dutch people